Myosin regulatory light chain interacting protein, also known as MYLIP, is a protein that in humans is encoded by the MYLIP gene.

MYLIP is also known as IDOL "Inducible Degrader of the LDL receptor" based on its involvement in cholesterol regulation or MIR "Modulator Of Immune Recognition".  The expression of IDOL is induced by the sterol-activated liver X receptor.

Increased Degradation of LDL Receptor Protein (IDOL) is a ubiquitin ligase that ubiquinates LDL receptors in endosomes and directs the receptors to the lysosomal compartment for degradation. IDOL is transcriptionally up-regulated by LXR/RXR in response to an increase in intracellular cholesterol. Pharmacologic inhibition of IDOL could reduce plasma LDL cholesterol by increasing plasma LDL receptor density.

Function 

The ERM protein family members ezrin, radixin, and moesin are cytoskeletal effector proteins linking actin to membrane-bound proteins at the cell surface. Myosin regulatory light chain interacting protein (MYLIP) is a novel ERM-like protein that interacts with myosin regulatory light chain and inhibits neurite outgrowth.

References

Further reading